Krestovsky Ushkovsky
 Krestovsky Island
 Yaroslav Krestovsky
 Vsevolod Krestovsky
 Krestovsky Ostrov (Saint Petersburg Metro)
 Krestovsky Lesouchastok